Shotor Khvar (also Romanized as Shotor Khvār and Shotor Khār; also known as Maḩmūdābād-e Shotor Khvār) is a village in Jalilabad Rural District, Jalilabad District, Pishva County, Tehran Province, Iran. At the 2006 census, its population was 340, in 81 families.

References 

Populated places in Pishva County